Bali TV is a privately owned Indonesian television station belongs to Bali Post Media Group covering the island of Bali.

The station became well known for regularly broadcasting in the Balinese language. Some examples include the broadcast of Balinese songs and ceremonies. The station also broadcasting in Indonesian language at the news section.

Controversies

Ban on Seputar Bali
From 8 to 11 May 2013, the Seputar Bali news programme was banned from airing by Indonesian Broadcasting Commission Bali Branch because of its biased coverage of the gubernatorial election and the candidates (no cover-both-sides).

See also 
 List of television stations in Indonesia
 Media of Indonesia

References

External links 
 Official Site 

Television stations in Indonesia
Television channels and stations established in 2002
Mass media in Bali
2002 establishments in Indonesia